The 19th Meril Prothom Alo Awards ceremony, presented by Prothom Alo took place on 21 April 2017 at the Bangabandhu International Conference Center in Dhaka, Bangladesh as a part of 2016 film awards season.

Facts and figures
This year Amitabh Reza Chowdhury received best film director award for Aynabaji. Shakib Khan secured his eighth award for Public Choice best film actor and this was fifth in a row from 2010. Nusrat Imroz Tisha in Public Choice best TV actress category for Ekti Taalgachher Golpo. Dilshad Nahar Kona got the awards in best female singer category again and that was double Hat-trick for her since 2009.

Nominees and winners
A total of 16 awards were given at the ceremony. Following is the list of the winners.

Lifetime Achievement Award – 2016

 Syed Hasan Imam

Public Choice Awards – 2016

Critics Choice Awards – 2016

See also
Bachsas Awards
Babisas Award

References

External links

Meril-Prothom Alo Awards ceremonies
2016 film awards
2017 awards in Bangladesh
2017 in Dhaka
April 2017 events in Bangladesh